Judith (Judy) Zelman (born 16 May 1967 in Ottawa, Ontario - died 3 February 2007) was a paralympic athlete from Canada competing mainly in category 1C events.

Zelman competed in the 1984 Summer Paralympics in athletics. Her best result came in the Women's Shot Put 1C where she won a silver medal. Her other three medals came in the form of bronze medals.

Zelman also competed in the 1988 Summer Paralympics and 1992 Summer Paralympics. She died on 3 February 2007 after a brief battle with breast cancer, aged 39

References

1967 births
2007 deaths
Athletes (track and field) at the 1984 Summer Paralympics
Athletes (track and field) at the 1988 Summer Paralympics
Athletes (track and field) at the 1992 Summer Paralympics
Paralympic silver medalists for Canada
Paralympic bronze medalists for Canada
Athletes from Ottawa
Medalists at the 1984 Summer Paralympics
Paralympic medalists in athletics (track and field)
Paralympic track and field athletes of Canada
Canadian female wheelchair racers
Canadian female shot putters
Canadian female javelin throwers
Wheelchair shot putters
Wheelchair javelin throwers
Paralympic shot putters
Paralympic javelin throwers
Deaths from breast cancer